Public/social/private partnerships are methods of co-operation between private and government bodies.

Background

Models of cooperation between the market and the state: examples from Austria
The name “public social private partnership” (PSPP) is a development of Public Private Partnership (PPP).

PPP is one expression of a strong trend towards (re)privatisation, which in some European countries has arisen as a result of more difficult economic conditions in recent years and the associated structural crisis in the public sector (see Eschenbach, Müller, Gabriel: 1993). 

The growth in public-private partnerships as a way of fulfilling public tasks in partnership between the state administration and private enterprises must be seen in this context.

In political discussions, lack of public funds is often put forward as a limit on state activities. Instead of financing infrastructure projects alone, the government increasingly looks to cooperations with private investors. Also, the EU policy on competitive tendering of public works and services has forced changes towards a more market-oriented approach to delivering tasks for which the state is responsible. Another relevant factor are the arguments in debates on privatisation that state bodies are inefficient and that management concepts typical in the commercial sector should be used to achieve more cost-effective provision of public services.
All these factors taken together result in a shift away from a role of the state as “producer” towards one as “quality assurer” and a trend away from collective, tax-based financing of infrastructure to financing models in which these are paid for by their users (see Budäus 2006).

The term PPP has gained currency for this increased cooperation of government with private partners in the German-speaking countries since about the middle of the 1990s. 

Public private partnership contrasted with conventional provision of public services
PPPs can be said to differ from other forms of provision of public services in the following 3 points:

 In PPPs, the ownership of the project is shared. The heart of a PPP is thus the sharing of risks and profits.
 Compared to providing the service directly, in a PPP the state can concentrate on its core competences. The state does not need to allocate experts of its own for the implementation of the project and is thus less intimately involved.
 Additionally, PPPs exhibit a trend away from conventional, tax-based financing approaches towards financing through contributions of individual users (e.g. tolls for motorways).

From PPP to PSPP
In the social services sector, PPPs have been implemented mainly in the health services and overseas development until now. As current discussions about PPPs in the social services sector show (see e.g. the EQUAL development partnership “Public Social Private Partnership” ; workshop at the University of Cologne, Germany “PPP in social and educational services”, March 2006; Conference: “Partnerships in Work Integration: Added Value for Enterprises?”, Zürich, Switzerland, October 2005), this sector has special requirements and will need special conditions and criteria for possible PPPs. The definition of goals is a particularly central and sensitive issue in finding a suitable form and modalities of implementation of PPPs in this area. Existing types of PPP will likely need to be modified to include extra mechanisms and criteria in order to function adequately in social services. 

In other words, public social private partnership (PSPP) is not merely an extension of the PPP idea, but a precondition for ensuring that a PPP with a social goal: 
 assures and implements the public aims, agendas and tasks in the sense of community benefit, welfare, etc.;
 adheres to and sustains the agendas and aims of cooperations in the mid- and long-term;
 plans and suitably applies the necessary conditions and resources (e.g. financing) for sustainable results.

For the state side of the partnership the redefinition from PPP to PSPP means that mid- to long-term solutions are found for functions that the state needs to fulfil for reasons of the common good or welfare provision. By addressing state functions in the form of partnerships, the state partner gains options for action: firstly through a cooperative form of outsourcing (including financing) and secondly by involving additional partners from private enterprise and social enterprise in doing things which the state has responsibility for. Both of these aspects allow the state to do its job in a more rounded, professional and sustainable way by bringing in additional finance, expertise and practical resources. 

For private enterprises, PSPP opens up possibilities for new kinds of business activity through the cooperation with the state and social enterprise. 

PSPPs offer social enterprises an opportunity to act in their ideal role of intermediaries between the state and private sectors, helping to make sure that each partner's contribution to the project is in an area where they have special competence. This reduces the risks for all partners. The social enterprise partners stand to gain from a PSPP in terms of planning, development and quality due to the mid- and long-term nature of the projects. 

Finally, for target groups of disadvantaged people, PSPPs can mean the assurance of services that they need, and that the welfare state has led them to expect; and also, mid- and long-term PSPPs have the chance to anticipate future needs and develop innovative solutions and services. 

To summarize, application of a PPP model to fulfilling social aims for people in disadvantaged situations naturally leads to expansion of the PPP to a PSPP. PSPP rather than PPP criteria become applicable when public aims such as the common good and welfare are being pursued. In this area, all the mid- and long-term indicators of success belonging to the agendas and goals of the cooperation depend on the correct adherence to PSPP specifications.

PSPP: public social private partnership – description of the model

Description
Observing the discussions among representatives of social enterprise on the issue of “public social private partnership”, it becomes apparent that it is necessary to distinguish between a broad and a narrow definition. The definition can be regarded as a basis on which a specification is to be constructed.
PSPP in the broad definition covers, like PPP, cooperation models between the participants. In the case of public social private partnership these are not only agencies of the state and private enterprises (as in PPP) but also social enterprises and social economic organizations. The focus is on the partnership formed between the participating organizations and enterprises with the aim of working out and implementing social aims.
The two main characteristics of a PSPP in the broad definition are therefore:
The social purpose: Carrying out activities for the protection, support and improvement of opportunities for disadvantaged people or groups of disadvantaged people.
Implementation in partnership: The concept of partnership between firstly public, secondly purely commercial and thirdly social economic organizations and enterprises.

The specification of the PSPP model makes sense because of the needs of disadvantaged people and of the social economy and also those of the state and private enterprise mentioned above. In order to ensure that disadvantaged people are not excluded completely or partially from social participation, their needs must be supplied long-term and uninterruptedly. To do this, the relevant social services must be provided. This can only be guaranteed through longer-term financing. 
For that reason, the narrow definition of “public social private partnership” picks up on the financing aspect of the functional description of PPP and attempts to see how this can be harnessed for social interests. Also in this case the partnership aspect is important (see below), and only through it can the long-term nature and opening up of new fields of action be achieved. 

A PSP partnership is thus related to a specific field of activity and has the explicit purpose of assuring long-term financing and generation of resources for products and services in order to fulfil purposes of social protection, support and improvement of opportunities for disadvantaged people or groups of disadvantaged people: PPP as a financing and resource-generating instrument becomes PSPP in this case. 

The following three main characteristics make up a public social private partnership:

The “S” of the name indicates exactly the goal and purpose of the financing tool: the servicing of social protection and support interests and activities for the improvement of opportunities for disadvantaged people or groups of disadvantaged people. 
While PPPs as described in the literature as being used to execute public tasks in general, in PSPP the scope is narrowed to specifically social topics.
A PSPP has the character of a financing or resource-generating instrument. 
In order to act in the interest of social protection and support, i.e. to provide social services or introduce social products, in many cases it is necessary to set up and operate infrastructure. 
PSPP projects therefore aim at financing infrastructure that is used to realize social services and products. In this respect PSPPs do the same thing as PPP projects, which are also usually set up to finance infrastructure.
To provide social services it may not always be necessary to set up infrastructure on a large scale, but it is always necessary to carry out a phase of developing, planning and organizing the prerequisites for providing the social services. PSPP as a financing instrument can thus also be used to finance the development and preparation of social products and services that do not require any large infrastructure investments. 
Different financing instruments are used depending on whether infrastructure needs to be financed or not. 
“Partnership” means that to operate the tool at least two partners are required that will generate the finance and other resources needed to achieve the shared goal “s”. 
The PSPP characteristic “partnershaft” is also similar to a PPP. Three characteristics of PPPs identified by Budäus (2006:19) will be integrated at this point: 

 Partnership principle in the sense that the aims and expectations of benefit of the participating partner enterprises and organizations are compatible with each other. 
 Partnership principle in the sense of creation of synergies.
 Identity of the partner enterprises and organizations remains intact.

Also in this point PSPP differs from the conventional methods of delivering state services. In contrast to PPP projects, which can be formed with only two partners, “partnership” in the case of PSPP ideally involves a minimum of three partners, since there are three essential but different roles to be filled: The financing of the project, the project leadership and the demand for the social services.

In a PSPP three functions must therefore be exercised: 
At least one of the partners ensures the financing (financing level), at least one of the partners takes on the overall responsibility for the project and thus leads the coordination of the project from planning through setting-up and realization of the social product or service (project leadership) and at least one of the partners ensures the flow of funds into the project by buying the product or service (so also contributing to the financing). 
These three functions are – as described under roles and functions – ideally taken on by three partner enterprises and/or organizations that have the relevant competences and responsibilities. As a minimum, the synergies can also be created between two partner enterprises or organizations, so long as the three functions are present. 
In this way, a PSPP partnership is a partnership between two levels: the financing and the practical level.

Purposes
According to their historically conditioned self-understanding, contemporary European states have highly diverse tasks. A centrally important role is the social interest in various protective functions and activities. Besides the basic function of the state and community to stabilize or if possible to improve socially precarious or unstable conditions, the state has the duty to protect the weak and endangered at all levels of state activity, i.e. by law, in the justice system and in the administration.

Typical areas in which the state intervenes to protect people in weaker positions are consumer law, residential property rental and of course social law. The way the state(s) go about implementing these measures has to be seen against the background of the whole legal framework; the legal principles and practical methods involved are subject to continual theoretical (e.g. in terms of sociology, political science or philosophy) and practical (e.g. in the popular media or political interest groups) discussion. Connected to the issue of “protection” are terms such as “common good”, “human dignity”, “equality”, “welfare”, “clientele politics”, etc.

If the duty of the Hobbesian “Leviathan” to guarantee and provide protection is primarily related to individuals or subgroups of the state's population, then the interests of social maintenance directed towards the state will focus mainly on the assurance of whole-society pluralities and minimum standards. The interest in social maintenance stands alongside the interest in protection and complements it. For example, the laws that regulate the entitlement to unemployment money belong to the “protection” sphere, whereas the laws on the activities of political parties belong to the “maintenance” sphere; the overlapping of the two spheres of interests becomes evident when various parties, according to their political programmes, (can) take influence on the laws that govern the situation of unemployed people, by changing laws through the mechanisms provided by law for creating legislation. 

Such social “protection” and “maintenance” interest being addressed to the state place a duty upon it to serve these interests through legislation and in the exercise of executive power; both in the inner sphere of lawgiving, justice and administration and in the outer sphere of cooperation with non-state actors in the form of “social partnerships”.

The legal phrase “Gesellschaftliche Schutz- und Erhaltungsinteressen", i.e. social protection and maintenance interests, only partly defines the goals of a PSPP. This needs to be expanded for the purpose of the present discussion to “activities to improve the living situation and opportunities of people and groups of people in disadvantaged circumstances”. This expansion is more specific because it refers to people. However, the question as to when people or groups of people are or become socially disadvantaged remains open.

As a point of reference for PSPP the principles of action of a democratic state should be chosen. The democratically legitimated state follows principles of the common good as a way of “guaranteeing [its citizens] optimal overall opportunities for living and expression/development” (Reinhold 2000:204). The state's conception of what the common good is, is expressed in laws. This makes constitutions and city statutes the most suitable indicators of the smallest-common -denominator consensus as to what can be considered to be the common good in a democratically organised society. Beyond this, at any particular point in time the current government is an expression of the society's current vision of the common good. 
If we follow the chain of the “common good” orientation down from the national to the local level, we arrive at other structures e.g. in Austria the provinces and the local communities/municipalities, each of which has to some extent its own definition of the common good.
If certain people or groups of people do not have full access to the elements of what, as legitimated by the democratic legal system, is regarded as an acceptable minimum level of income, welfare, general living conditions and social participation, then we can say that they are socially disadvantaged. 

The state has the task of preventing social disadvantage and therefore has a duty to intervene wherever these basic needs cannot be filled by the market alone.
The reactions of the so-called civil society to disadvantageous circumstances may make disadvantage visible. This is most obvious when non-governmental alternative organizations and projects are started by citizens in order to relieve the disadvantages. These could be individual citizens, social economic organizations, self-help groups, and social projects in general.

We emphasize at this point that this does not imply a normative or prescriptive definition of what should be classified as social disadvantage. A descriptive approach, which takes account of the overall social system and its mechanisms of legitimation, was chosen.
 
Also, on the descriptive level – based on this definition – diverse characteristics of people or groups of people can be described, as a consequence of which these people may be disadvantaged:

The results of empirical social research show that there are three main factors that have a stronger and more predictable effect on social standing and opportunities, and therefore potential disadvantage, than others: These factors are:
 Social class
 Gender
 Ethnicity and/or nationality 

Besides these, many other factors can also be important. The most often mentioned are physical and intellectual abilities, sexual orientation, age, religion and educational level (in strong correlation with social class). The list of potential factors that could contribute to social disadvantage can, however – since it depends on the dimension mentioned above, the society's consensus on what represents the common good – never be complete, because factors that can cause disadvantage are always dependent on specific situations and issues.

The definition of aims is the heart of a PSPP. Because of this, all components of a PSPP (the interactions between the participating partner enterprises and organizations, the roles and functions in the partnership and the setting-up and practical implementation of the project) must be compatible with the specific set of aims defined by the partnership and must serve to realize these aims.
On the other hand, the route to realization of a specific, agreed goal and the structures that are set up to allow the project to be realized, should conform to the general definition of aims described here. This means that the structures and agreements of the partnership and the project process itself must be designed so that these also serve to improve the living situation of disadvantaged people as defined above.

Roles and functions
In a PSPP three main roles are exercised:
Financing of the infrastructure for implementation of social products and services, i.e. Financing of development of social products and services
Project Leadership i.e. research / analysis of needs, ideas, coordination from planning through set-up and operation
 Demand: Assurance of cash flow by agreeing to buy the products and services

All three roles can be done by different partners. But in the different sectors involved (state, social economy, private enterprise) each has its own interests and areas of competence, so that they will naturally have different interests and priorities as to the roles they wish to play in the partnership.

Preconditions for a PSPP
Building on the previous remarks on the PPP concept and the related quality model PSPP, we can posit as a precondition for the step from a PPP to a PSPP the willingness of all parties involved to define / accept only solutions, aims and agendas that will have mid- to long-term character. (By this we do not mean that the products of the partnership could only be generated in the mid- to long-term; this is not the same thing). This applies both to the goals themselves and also in the sense that conditions should be created that make it possible for the products of the partnership to have a lasting effect.
This condition, arises, in contrast to a PPP, from the fact that the agendas of a PSPP are tasks and aims of the state (common good / welfare) that do not obey the laws of supply and demand. These goals and contents lie instead in the delivery of an agreed level of common good to civil society. Such fundamental social agreements are central and necessary building blocks for a social peace based on security and justice, where citizens can rely on pre-agreed levels of state functions and can set up their lives accordingly. This is a precondition for preventing people from being disadvantaged or finding themselves in living situations that tend towards them becoming disadvantaged.
In this way, “mid-term” PSPPs can be defined as those that have a similar lifetime to the electoral cycles of municipalities and states; any that take place on a longer time base can be called long-term (quantitatively), and can be seen as (qualitatively) supporting the long-term assurance of state supports promised in constitutions and municipal statutes.

Order of events
The starting point of a PSPP is a recognition by a social enterprise of a social problem (e.g. an organization working with disabled people realizes that many people with disabilities in rural areas are faced with a problem of distance between their homes and workplaces). An idea is formed about how this problem could be solved, and the social enterprise develops a concept – drawing on their long experience and expertise in the area – for a social service, for which some infrastructure needs to be set up (e.g. sheltered accommodation close to the workplace, in which various needs, depending on gender, age or cultural background, can be catered for). In order to be able to realize the project, the social enterprise approaches a partner enterprise that could supply the necessary finance (e.g. a local bank) and brings in a state agency that has an interest in the project being done (e.g. the local social service responsible for people with disabilities, or the regional social department). This ensures the cash flow by buying the social service and makes possible a more economical financing by the commercial partner. 
The social enterprise then plans the execution of the project, sets up if necessary a legal vehicle for the project, sets up the necessary infrastructure (builds the sheltered housing project) and realizes & runs the social service (the support of the inhabitants).
In this example, the order of events and some division of roles is already evident. The phases of a PSPP can be summarized again as follows:

 Needs analysis 
In the needs analysis, factors that cause and/or reinforce disadvantage are researched and analysed. 
Idea 
Development of social products and services
Setting-up of the financing partnership with state and commercial organizations
Planning of the practical implementation
Setting-up of the infrastructure or other preparations for realizing the products / services
Implementation: Operation of the infrastructure and provision of the social services / supply of the social products

Financing
The classification of the models is based on PPP models, since forms of cooperation between two partners can be taken as a starting point for forms involving three partners. The description above thus includes the models to be found in PPP practice, with the exception of the company management (Betriebsführung) and company transfer (Betriebsüberlassung) models, since in these no positive effects are to be expected if a third partner were brought in, and these forms exhibit the lowest efficiency gains of all PPPs.

Financing instruments as additional elements of PSPP:
 Factoring
The starting point of (true) factoring is a long-term contractual arrangement between the municipality and a private person, on the basis of which the private person provides a public service. Due to the assured flow of payments (payment according to time) this model could in principle be considered for all PSPPs. The factoring consists in the further stage in which the private operator / owner sells a part of the future income from the contract with the state at cash value (minus a commission) to a factoring institute and uses the price to finance the project, so that only a low level of owner's equity is needed. (see  Kirchhoff 1995). This is especially useful for medium-sized enterprises, in order to compete with the strongly capitalized large corporations. 
 Municipality Guarantee
In addition to the factoring by the private partner, it is not uncommon to further optimise the financing costs in PSPP by adding a guarantee given by the municipality / state authority to the other forms of security provided for loans.
 Silent partnership
Silent partnerships involve a limited-term raising of capital by bringing in a silent partner, who normally comes in simply for the dividend. (see Kirchhoff 1995). 
 Public financing aids
In certain models for communal social economic purposes, public financing aids in the form of reduced-interest loans or investment grants can be availed of in addition to private-sector capital and equity. The EU, the federal republic and the provinces offer grants for research, planning and implementation of communal social investments.
 Sponsoring 
Sponsoring is essentially an exchange transaction (see Arnold, Maelicke 2003). The sponsor pays the sponsored organization in the form of money, in kind, or services. In return the sponsor acquires certain rights to advertise its involvement. It therefore uses the sponsored organization as an element of its advertising strategy. Both sides ought to derive benefit from the exchange.
A further constitutive feature of sponsoring is the contractual definition of the quid pro quo. Both parties must clearly understand their contractual obligations. A written contract is not mandatory, but is much to be recommended.
 Social Bonds
Another possible financing method is the issuing of bonds. Investors can take out a bond with a reduced interest rate and in this way make an indirect donation to PSPP projects. Compared with typical bond schemes, whose interest levels are coupled to the credit rating of the company, and have minimum volume limits of approximately € 50 million (or € 5 million in the case of the new mid cap bonds), social bonds, with the waiver of a part of the interest by the investors, have definite advantages for social enterprises. A successful example is the “ELAG SOCIAL bond“ (ELAG=Elisabeth Liegenschafts-Entwicklungs-Aktiengesellschaft, Elisabeth Real Estate Development Stock Corporation). This stock company formed by the Caritas of the diocese of Linz and the KOOP Lebensraum Beteiligungs-AG has used the bond issue to ensure compliance with its investment rules, which specify low-risk investment, charitable-social purpose and investment in properties that should yield dividends not less than the rate of inflation.

Sample List of Corporations and Investors active in the financing, ownership and development of Public-Private Partnerships around the world.

 Balfour Beatty
 Cintra
 SNC Lavalin
 Carlyle Group
 Alinda Capital Partners
 National Standard Finance
 Meridiam/AECOM
 Siemens
 Barclays
 CH2M Hill
 Acciona

Description of various PSPP models

Service models
 Complex contracting-out
Contracting-out generally means hiving off organizational units as private entities and/or purchase of services from private providers under the state contracting/tendering rules. This is the state equivalent of the already well-established trend in commercial business of outsourcing in order to concentrate on one's core competence (see Müller, Prankebenberg 1997).

Special financing forms
 Leasing and fund leasing
The minimal specifications of PPP as regards communal leasing mean that not all leasing activities of municipalities qualify for the title of PPPs. Especially, much product leasing, such as simple leasing of equipment without services, does not fall under the definition of PPP. The leasing variants that qualify as a form of PPP are those in which an investor chosen by competitive bidding supplies more than the mere provision of financing, e.g. by providing complementary services and taking on additional practical tasks. The private partner in such cases is responsible for major pieces of implementation of a project. (see Höftmann 2001). 
 Concession model
Concession models are similar to leasing models conceptually and in terms of the applicable accounting rules, but all the restrictions of leasing, particularly problems of tax and property law, are avoided. At the centre of the model is the waiver of preferential tax treatment both on the part of the project leader and the finance provider, so that in the concession model no savings can be made on the basis of taxation technicalities. The less stringent conditions for setting up such a vehicle thus have their price and are reflected in higher annual rates of rent compared to leasing (see Scheele 1993).

Provider model
 Provider Model
The basic idea of a provider model is that the municipality hands over the fulfilment of its statutory tasks to a private provider in such a way that the complete task is temporarily outsourced. The municipality private capital and expertise is brought into a project during the setting-up and operational phases, without the private partner acquiring shares in the operating company – effectively a form of limited-term privatisation (see Rudolph, Büscher 1995). 
 BOT Model (Build-Operate-Transfer)
Since the operator models with a lifetime of 20–30 years are long-term arrangements and a premature transfer back to the municipality is not possible, BOT (build, operate, transfer) models with a lifetime of three to ten years have been developed as a shorter-term variant. (see Kirchoff 1997). These are basically transitional solutions with private-sector planning and setting-up as well as temporary private-sector operation in the relatively risk-intensive early years, so that BOT models could be called short-term operator models (see Höftmann 2001).
 Cooperation model
The basic idea of a cooperation model is the setting-up of a private legal entity, in which both the municipality and at least one private enterprise hold shares either directly or indirectly (through an intermediate holding company). This type of mixed municipal/private, or semi-state ownership has been in common use for about 100 years, especially in utilities with a local monopoly on provision (see Hering, Matschke 1997).

Limits and risks
PSPPs offer not only opportunities but also bring risks, especially for the state partner (and their budget). Entry into a PSPP on the part of the state is based on the expectation that additional resources can be generated or mobilized in order to increase the scope of public social services.
Due to the responsibilities of the state, the state partner must carefully evaluate what is made the subject of a PSPP – with whom, for how long and under what conditions. Long-term effects must be anticipated. The evaluation process needs comprehensive, long-term and operational criteria, quality assurance, a political decision and a critical analysis of the PSPP as to its suitability as an instrument for the intended purpose. For public institutions, a PSPP can increase the room for manoeuvre, but this process must not take place at the expense of erosion or abdication of responsibility by the state authority. 
The state must be careful not to surrender control of activities over which it is democratically mandated to exercise adequate control. This issue is the subject of extensive discussions as it applies to PPPs: the growing influence of private actors and the correspondingly retreating influence of the state (see e.g. B. Pölzl/Preisch 2003: 41).
This makes it all the more important to emphasize that PSPP models should only be supported by the state in cases where they serve the long-term social needs of disadvantaged members of society. This responsibility belongs to the state and the state only.

To reap the full benefits of a PSPP for all involved parties, it must be ensured that the clear definition of social aims and partnership process on the one hand is not outweighed by the impetus to generate and mobilize resources and finance on the other hand. It is essential for the implementation of a PSPP to preserve the partnership throughout. This means that the autonomy of the social economic partners must be protected and they must not be brought into a position of such dependency by entering a PSPP that their autonomy is sacrificed or weakened. 

Since public goals and agendas can be matched to mid- and long-term solutions by using PSPPs, a qualitative approach can be used. 

Some concern about the quality of the services that are provided in the course of PPPs exists both in public opinion and among some representatives of the state sector. The specification of a PSPP in terms of the social aims (in contrast to PPPs) is a positive quality factor. Due to the orientation of the model according to these aims and the resulting processes and conditions (needs analysis and product development by experts working in the social sector, partnership principles, etc.), the model places great emphasis on the quality of implementation of the PSPP. Nonetheless, it must be said that the quality of the social products and services produced  will always be the responsibility of 
 the people and organizations who have the decision-making competence in development and implementation of the social products and services;
 the internal project controlling;
 and the enterprises and organizations that control all the relevant aspects of the environment in which the project takes place (financing, regulation of activities, etc.) through the partnership negotiation process; this requires responsible and serious behaviour not only on the part of the private and social-economic actors but also crucially on the part of the state representatives.

Prospects: opportunities and potential
If the conditions for when a PSPP should be used, and the quality criteria, are respected, a PSPP can be of great benefit for the social target group it aims to help as well as for the participating organizations and enterprises.

In a PSPP, needs of disadvantaged people or groups of people that have been previously neglected can be met, or the spectrum of services available to them can be expanded. Private enterprises are usually strongly oriented towards meeting customer (consumer) demands. In a PSPP this also applies to the social enterprises, which in contrast to non-social economic enterprises and organizations exhibit a stronger responsiveness towards the needs of their clients.

The solutions developed in a PSPP can also be offered on a mid- to long-term basis and thus contribute to a sustainable establishment of new activities and structural change.

For private or social economic enterprises / organizations, the participation in a PSPP offers an expansion of their fields of business and the opportunity to become active in already established and newly developed fields as competent partners. Social economic organizations or enterprises gain an opportunity to make necessary longer-term investments which would not be possible in a conventional working relationship with the state (i.e. by simple buying of services by the state).

On the other hand, the state can make use of the specialist expertise of the social economic and private companies. This should allow all the participants to concentrate on their core competences. The state can gain an opportunity to do the tasks it is responsible for efficiently, cost-effectively and without delays due to budgetary bottlenecks.

In addition to the special benefits for disadvantaged people, the positive effects of “classical” PPPs apply (Pölzl/Preisch 2003):
 Exploitation of synergy effects through mutual sharing of information and capabilities
 Opening up of new ways of financing investments
 Goal-oriented division of tasks and functions results in increased efficiency
 The previous two points, taken together, result in time savings
 Smaller risks for individual participants through sharing of risks

The opportunities offered by PSPPs can be exploited best when the participating organizations can avail of the necessary know-how in the form of accompanying consulting and support by appropriate professionals. In Austria, even PPP is still a relatively new phenomenon – in contrast to Germany, neither a national “PPP Facilitation Act” nor PPP Task Forces to ensure professional setting up of PPPs. The expansion of the PPP concept by adding the qualitative aspect of the explicit social aims is even more dependent on competent support to implement the relatively complex projects with good quality and successfully. Not only purely private/commercial approaches on the one hand need and public administration principles, rules and procedures on the other hand need to be dealt with, but also the competences needed for the social service elements need to be fitted together suitably.

From the point of view of social policy, PSPPs, if the procedure described is followed and needs analysis is done by social economic organizations and enterprises working in the field, can open up new fields of activity, not only for the social and private enterprises but also for the state. PSPPs are a chance for development of social services not as a purely top-down process (in which the state formulates the needs and contracts the corresponding works) but that needs can be recognized and formulated by agents and organizations of civil society and these can be met in cooperation with the state. To make use of this chance, the state must be flexible and open to innovation and the political and legal environment must be compatible with this bottom-up approach. Many established social phenomena, e.g. the Red Cross movement or the women's emancipation movement, began in the private or civil-society spheres and were later picked up and supported by the state; and through state support, their development was importantly influenced.

See also
 Global public–private partnership
 Social business
 Social enterprise

References

Literature
 Brooks, Stephen: "The Mixed Ownership Corporation as an Instrument of Public Policy". In: Comparative Politics, Vol. 19 (1987), No. 2, S. 173-191
 Budäus, Dietrich (Hg., 9): "Kooperationsformen zwischen Staat und Markt. Theoretische Grundlagen und praktische Ausprägungen von Public Private Partnership", Schriftenreie der Gesellschaft für öffentliche Wirtschaft, Heft 54, Baden-Baden 2006.
 European Commission: Green Paper on Public Private Partnership, Brussels 2004; 
 Kukovetz, Brigitte; Leonhardt, Manfred; Loidl-Keil, Rainer: Public Social Private Partnership zur Realisierung sozialer Dienstleistungen, In: kontraste, 02/07.
 Mitchell-Weaver, Clyde; Manning, Brenda: Public-Private Partnerships in Third World Development: A Conceptual Overview. In: Studies in Comparative International Development, Vol. 26 (1991–92), No. 4, S. 45-67.
 Modigliani, Franko; Miller Merton: "The Cost of Capital, Corporation Finance and the Theory of Investment". In: American Economic Review (June 1958).
 Parkin, Frank: "Strategies of social closure in class formation", In Parkin, Frank (Hg.): The social analysis of class structure, London 1978, S.1-18.

Public administration
Social entrepreneurship
Privatization